Jack Allen is a former politician in Northern Ireland. Working as a businessman, Allen became a member of the Ulster Unionist Party (UUP). He was elected to Londonderry City Council. In 1974-75, he served as Mayor of Derry.

Allen was elected to the Northern Ireland Assembly, 1982, representing Londonderry.  The following year, he became the Honorary Treasurer of the UUP. In June 1984, Allen was appointed to the prominent role of Chairman of the Devolution Report Committee within the Assembly.

In this position, he wrote three times to leader of the Social Democratic and Labour Party John Hume proposing discussions, but was rebuffed. In 1984, amid a dispute about the name of the city council, Allen was defeated in a by-election for a ward on the city council.

Allen headed the UUP list in Foyle for the Northern Ireland Forum election of 1996, but failed to be elected.  At the 1998 Northern Ireland Assembly election, he was again unsuccessful in Foyle, despite coming fourth on first preference votes in the six seat constituency.  During this period, he was the chairman of the Foyle Ulster Unionist constituency association.

Allen stood down as UUP treasurer in 2005, citing ill health.

References

Year of birth missing (living people)
Living people
Mayors of Derry
Northern Ireland MPAs 1982–1986
Ulster Unionist Party councillors
Politicians from County Londonderry